John Seaton (15 January 1844 – 14 October 1918) was an English cricketer. Seaton was a right-handed batsman who bowled right-arm medium pace. He was born at Nottingham, Nottinghamshire.

Seaton made his first-class debut for Nottinghamshire against a combined Yorkshire in 1872 at Prince's Cricket Ground, Chelsea. He made three further first-class appearances for Nottinghamshire in that season, against Surrey at The Oval, Yorkshire at Bramall Lane, and Gloucestershire at Clifton College Close Ground. In his four first-class matches, Seaton scored 80 runs at an average of 11.42, with a high score of 27. He also took a single wicket with the ball.

He died at Oldham, Lancashire on 14 October 1918.

References

External links
John Seaton at ESPNcricinfo
John Seaton at CricketArchive

1844 births
1918 deaths
Cricketers from Nottingham
English cricketers
Nottinghamshire cricketers